Sheridan Road is a major north-south street that leads from Diversey Parkway in Chicago, Illinois, north to the Illinois-Wisconsin border and beyond to Racine. Throughout most of its run, it is the easternmost north-south through street, closest to Lake Michigan. From Chicago, it passes through Chicago's wealthy lakeside North Shore suburbs, and then Waukegan and Zion, until it reaches the Illinois-Wisconsin state line in Winthrop Harbor. In Wisconsin, the road leads north through Pleasant Prairie and Kenosha, until it ends on the south side of Racine, in Mount Pleasant. 

From North Chicago to the state line, Sheridan Road is signed as part of Illinois Route 137 in Illinois, and Wisconsin Highway 32 through Kenosha and Racine in Wisconsin. Sheridan Road is known for its historic sites, lakefront parks, and gracious mansion homes in Evanston through Lake Bluff. Sheridan Road is also very popular with cyclists, with many riders using the road north of the terminus of the Lakefront Trail.

Chicago path
 It runs at 400 west from 2800 north (Diversey Parkway) to 3181 north (Belmont Avenue).
 It runs at 3900 north from 600 (Lake Shore Drive) west to 956 west (Sheffield Avenue).
 It runs at 1000 west from 3900 north (Byron Street) to 6356 north. 
 It runs at 6400 north from 970 west to 1158 west (Broadway).
 It runs at 1200 west from 6400 north (Broadway/Devon Avenue) to 6756 north (Pratt Boulevard).
 It runs from 1200 west at 6800 north to 1400 west at 7800 north (northern city limit).

History
A suburban extension of Chicago's Lake Shore Drive to Waukegan was first promoted by the North Shore Improvement Association in the late 1880s. In 1889 this road was named Sheridan Road for Philip Henry Sheridan, a general in the Civil War who coordinated military relief efforts in Chicago following the Great Chicago Fire. Much of the route had been laid out by 1893, and in 1894 it was proposed that the new road should be extended to Milwaukee, Wisconsin. Progress on the construction of the road was slowed by local opposition in some of the communities that it was to pass through, and construction was not completed until 1918. A statue of Sheridan by artist Gutzon Borglum was placed alongside Sheridan Road and Belmont Avenue in Chicago's Lincoln Park in 1924.

Illinois Route 42

Sheridan Road in Illinois was once signed as Illinois Route 42. The route was first shown on official maps in 1924; the original route ran along Sheridan Road from the Wisconsin border to Waukegan, then turned west along Washington Street, south along Green Bay Road (now part of IL 131), east along Rockland Road (now part of IL 176) before running south along Waukegan Road (now mostly part of IL 43). In 1925, Route 42 was realigned to include all of Sheridan Road in Illinois; the route continued south to the Indiana border at Hammond, and the old route became Illinois Route 42A. In 1929, the southern terminus of Route 42 was changed to the south end of Sheridan Road as US 41 supplanted the southern part of the route. This made the route coextensive with the Illinois portion of Sheridan Road. Sheridan Road was marked as Route 42 until the highway was removed from the state highway system in 1972.

Places of interest
There are several landmarks and places of interest along Sheridan Road.  In order from southernmost to northernmost:

 Commonwealth Plaza Condominiums
Philip Henry Sheridan Statue
 The Breakers at Edgewater Beach Apartments
 Park Tower Condominium
 The Renaissance (Building at 5510 North Sheridan)
Edgewater Condominium Plaza, 5445 North Sheridan occupies the precise spot of Edgewater Beach Hotel; 5455 North Sheridan, its twin building is set at right angle to the street)
Edgewater Beach Apartments
Colvin House
Mundelein College Skyscraper Building
Loyola University, Lakeshore Campus
Emil Bach House
Calvary Cemetery
Northwestern University
Levere Memorial Temple, headquarters of Sigma Alpha Epsilon fraternity
Grosse Point Lighthouse
Bahá'í House of Worship
Plaza del Lago
Henry Demarest Lloyd House
North Shore Congregation Israel
Ravinia Festival
North Shore Sanitary District Tower
Willits House
Fort Sheridan
Barat College
Lake Forest College
Great Lakes Naval Training Center
AbbVie
Genesee Theatre
Illinois Beach State Park
Chiwaukee Prairie
Kenosha Sand Dunes
Gilbert M. Simmons Memorial Library
Bradford Community Church
Dinosaur Discovery Museum
Carthage College

See also
Marshall/Goldblatt mansion, demolished mansion formerly located along Sherdian Road in Wilmette, Illinois

Footnotes

Evanston, Illinois
Glencoe, Illinois
Highland Park, Illinois
Highwood, Illinois
Kenosha, Wisconsin
Lake Bluff, Illinois
Lake Forest, Illinois
North Chicago, Illinois
Racine, Wisconsin
Streets in Chicago
Streets in Illinois
Streets in Wilmette, Illinois
Streets in Wisconsin
Transportation in Lake County, Illinois
Waukegan, Illinois
Winnetka, Illinois
Zion, Illinois